Once Upon a Time in Hollywood: A Novel is the 2021 debut novel by Quentin Tarantino. It is a novelization of his 2019 film of the same name.

It debuted at number one on [[The New York Times Best Seller list|The New York Times''' fiction best-seller list]].

 Background 

According to Tarantino, the novel is "a complete rethinking of the entire story" and adds details to various sequences and characters, including multiple chapters dedicated to the backstory of Cliff Booth. The novel also departs from the film; the film's finale occurs towards the beginning of the novel, and its aftermath includes Rick Dalton earning newfound fame as a regular on The Tonight Show Starring Johnny Carson. It also focuses on Charles Manson's pursuit of a music career and the "inner worlds" of Sharon Tate and Trudi Frazer.

There is a chapter dedicated to the Manson Family's "creepy crawls". In it, Manson instructs "Pussycat" to break into a wealthy, elderly couple's house while they are sleeping. Manson encouraged going into wealthy unvacated homes, which the Manson girls would enter and steal valuables. He taught them to wear dark clothing and "crawl" through the house. The term "creepy crawl" was invented by the Manson girls.

Tarantino explains the inner thoughts of the controversial Bruce Lee–Cliff Booth fight, saying that Booth tricks Lee into the fight and Booth is fighting his own instinct to murder Lee more than Lee himself. Booth is a "ringer," a stuntman brought in and paid on the side to hurt actors who "tag" (hit for real) stuntmen. Lee does this and Booth believes Lee's kung fu is all for show and screen, and that judo is a superior martial art. Booth is brought in as a ringer to the sets of Hurry Sundown and The Wild Wild West, where he hits Otto Preminger and Robert Conrad in the face, "knocking [them] on their ass[es]". "Pussycat" refers to Booth as "Mr. Blonde," the alias of Vic Vega (Michael Madsen) in Tarantino's Reservoir Dogs.

The novel includes an entire chapter on the career of Lancer lead, James Stacy. It also contains a chapter detailing how Booth came to own his pit bull, Brandy, and another chapter focused on Booth living in France after escaping from a Filipino jungle as a POW. Tarantino based the Brandy and POW chapters on true stories.

Critique is given on a large amount of mid-century films and filmmakers through the minds of Tate, Dalton, and Booth. The latter is a movie buff, who believes Michelangelo Antonioni is a fraud and has given up on the films of Federico Fellini. However, he is a fan of Akira Kurosawa, Alan Ladd, and erotic films, some of which he views at the (now Tarantino-owned) New Beverly Cinema. When he goes to see I Am Curious (Yellow), "Cliff wanted to lick the screen." The character's appreciation of pop music is expressed in the novel as well. While Roman Polanski hates Bubblegum music, Tate silently likes it. She notably enjoys Ohio Express's "Yummy Yummy Yummy" and "Chewy Chewy," Bobby Sherman and his song "Julie, Do Ya Love Me," and The Royal Guardsmen's "Snoopy vs. the Red Baron". "She liked The Monkees more than The Beatles." Booth is an avid Tom Jones fan, and especially of the song, "Delilah," because as Tarantino states, "Cliff is partial to songs about guys who kill their women."

Tarantino wrote another scene in the novel that he also had in the screenplay of the film and shot but did not include because of pacing and timing concerns. It is the final part of the novel and involves a phone call between Rick Dalton and Trudi Frazer played by Leonardo DiCaprio and Julia Butters in the film, on the evening after their day shooting Lancer together. They do a line reading and reminisce about the day and Trudi reminds Dalton how lucky they are to do what they do, making him genuinely realize "for the first time in ten years... how fortunate he is and was." Tarantino said, "that was my favorite scene in the script. I think it was probably Leo's favorite scene that he shot. We were in tears... Julia and I were in tears every time we finished every take."

 Lancer plot 
The novel includes several chapters detailing Lancer's backstory as a "mini-novelization-within-a-novelization." It has been described as though "you've landed in a Louis L'Amour novel."

In Royo del Oro, California Scott and Johnny Madrid Lancer arrive on a Butterfield stagecoach.  The two brothers each received telegrams summoning them. They are greeted by their little sister, eight-year-old Mirabella and ranch hand Ernesto. Their father Murdock is the richest man and owner of the biggest cattle ranch in the territory. Mirabella's mother died in a tragic accident.

Scott Foster Lancer, like his brother Johnny was born on the ranch but left at age three. He moved to Boston and was raised by his mother's wealthy family in Beacon Hill. Scott is a Harvard graduate and military veteran of the British Indian Army's Bengal Lancers where he earned two medals of bravery. He is currently earning a living as a riverboat gambler and rumored to have killed the son of a United States senator in a duel.

Johnny Madrid Lancer left the ranch when he was ten and was raised in Mexico by his mother Marta Conchita Louisa Galvadon, a musician, dancer and prostitute. After Marta left, Murdock spent five years searching for her and Johnny but to no avail. One of Marta's customers murdered her when Johnny was twelve. After the man was acquitted at trial, Johnny killed him and every member of the jury over the next ten years, which he took pleasure in. Ever since, he wanted to murder his father. Johnny has become an infamous gunfighter and dime novel legend being compared to the likes of Tom Horn and Billy the Kid. Murdock was finally able to track him down with the help of a Pinkerton detective.

Cattle poacher Caleb DeCoteau (an evil Hamlet-Edmund-cowboy De Sade) who is going insane due to syphilis, and his land pirates (Old West Hells Angels) had come to Royo del Oro to poach Murdock's livestock. They also terrorized the town, took over the saloon and hotel, whipped several men including the mayor and murdered Murdock's oldest friend and top ranch hand George Gomez. Once at the ranch, Murdock offered his sons equal stake in the ranch if they would help him fend off DeCoteau and the pirates.

DeCoteau and Johnny know each other and are on friendly terms. This and Johnny hating his father leads to him having an inner conflict and he considers helping DeCoteau. Johnny goes to town to meet with DeCoteau about possibly joining his posse but before he enters the saloon he is confronted by another hired gun of DeCoteau, Business Bob Gilbert. Johnny and Gilbert have a duel resulting in Gilbert's death. Johnny enters the saloon and sits down with DeCoteau without him knowing that he is Murdock's son. He agrees to join DeCoteau's gang but is still unsure if he will kill his father or DeCoteau.

DeCoteau later kidnaps Mirabella and negotiates a ransom with Scott. Mirabella is purity personified and the most precious thing to not only Murdock but also now Johnny and Scott. Scott walks into the saloon to see DeCoteau sitting on his "throne" with Mirabella in his lap. The negotiations lead to DeCoteau arranging for Murdock to meet him in Mexico with ten thousand dollars. With Johnny still in his gang DeCoteau discloses to him that if he is not paid he will murder Mirabella. Johnny reveals that he is Murdock's son, both men draw their pistols, and Johnny shoots DeCoteau dead. 

Publication
In November 2020, Tarantino signed a two-book deal with HarperCollins. On June 29, 2021, he published his first novel, an adaptation of Once Upon a Time in Hollywood in paperback, eBook, and digital audio editions. A deluxe hardcover was released on November 9, 2021. The deluxe edition contains Once Upon a Time in Hollywood memorabilia, including a script for an episode of Rick Dalton's Bounty Law, entitled Incident at Inez written by Tarantino. Tarantino stated, "In the seventies movie novelizations were the first adult books I grew up reading ... And to this day I have a tremendous amount of affection for the genre."

The audiobook is narrated by Jennifer Jason Leigh, who previously starred in Tarantino's The Hateful Eight. According to Tarantino, her Hateful Eight character Daisy Domergue was "A Manson girl out west, like Susan Atkins or something." On June 21, 2021, a trailer for the novel was released, containing never before seen footage from the film and  narrated by Kurt Russell, who was also the film's narrator.

Characters

Many fictional and historical characters appear in Once Upon a Time in Hollywood, including Bruce Lee, Steve McQueen, and members of the Manson Family. Other characters who appear in the novel include:

 Aldo Ray, an actor with a chapter titled and dedicated to him. Ray's procurement of a bottle of gin from Cliff Booth leads to him being fired from Red Blood, Red Skin, one of the Spaghetti Westerns Rick Dalton is starring in. Butch Coolidge (Bruce Willis) from Tarantino's Pulp Fiction was modeled after Aldo Ray in Nightfall, and Lt. Aldo Raine (Brad Pitt) from Tarantino's Inglourious Basterds was named after Ray.
 Curtis Zastoupil, Tarantino's step-father and a pianist who plays at a bar that Rick Dalton, Cliff Booth and James Stacy frequent after Dalton's day on Lancer. Zastoupil obtains Dalton's autograph for a six-year-old Tarantino.
 Dennis Wilson – The drummer for the rock band The Beach Boys. Wilson brought Manson Family members Ella Jo Bailey and Patricia Krenwinkel over to his house. He left and later returned to find Manson and the rest of his Family. They would move in making Wilson's residence their home for a period of time. Manson recorded songs he wrote at the home studio of Dennis' brother and bandmate Brian. The Beach Boys covered Manson's song "Cease to Exist" as the B-side to the single "Bluebirds Over the Mountain".
 Terry Melcher – The son of Doris Day and record producer for Columbia Records. He met Manson at Wilson's house. Manson visited Melcher at his house on 10050 Cielo Drive multiple times, and hoped to get a record deal through him and Wilson. However, Manson was unable to ingratiate himself with Melcher the way he did with Wilson. What most interested Melcher about the Family was teenage member Ruth Ann Moorehouse, whom he attempted to hire as a housekeeper. Manson tried to leverage Melcher's interest into a record deal, but Bergen did not allow Moorehouse to move in, as she suspected Melcher did not really intend for her to be a housekeeper.
 Candice Bergen – An actress and girlfriend of Melcher who lived with him on Cielo Drive.
 Gregg Jakobson – A songwriter who worked for Melcher and became close with the Manson Family. He frequently recorded Manson's music.
 Andrew Duggan – The actor who portrayed Murdoch Lancer on the TV series Lancer, whose character seeks out his two estranged sons from different mothers, to help save his ranch from the land pirates.
 Caleb DeCoteau – The fictional lead villain and leader of the land pirates on the pilot episode of Lancer, portrayed by Rick Dalton. While also featured in the film, in the novel it is revealed that Dalton beat out Joe Don Baker for the role. Baker portrayed Day Pardee, the lead villain and leader of the land Pirates in the real-life pilot of Lancer, whom Tarantino based DeCoteu on. He is named after filmmaker David DeCoteau.
 Jim Brown – An actor and NFL star. While Brown is in Spain shooting 100 Rifles, Cliff Booth becomes known as "the only white man to ever win a fistfight with Jim Brown." Tarantino considered writing Brown into the screenplay of the film, but never did. If he had he would have cast Jamie Foxx to play him.
 Ace Woody – A rodeo cowboy who gives Sharon Tate a ride from her hometown of Dallas, Texas to New Mexico on her way to Los Angeles. Woody originally appeared as a villain in the screenplay of Tarantino's Django Unchained. In Django Ace Woody was originally one of the biggest characters. He was a mandingo expert and right-hand man of Calvin Candie (Leonardo DiCaprio). Kevin Costner was originally cast in the role, followed by Kurt Russell. Both dropped out and the character was combined with Billy Crash (Walton Goggins). Ace Woody is named after Tarantino's maternal grandfather. The Once Upon a Time iteration of Woody is based on the title character from Sam Peckinpah's Junior Bonner (Steve McQueen). Like Bonner, Woody is returning home to Prescott, Arizona to participate in a rodeo.
 Janet Himmelsteen, introduced as Miss Himmelsteen is the secretary of Marvin Schwarz, Dalton's agent at the William Morris Agency. She goes on a date with Booth and in 1972 becomes an agent at William Morris. By 1975 she becomes one of their top agents. A similarly named Mrs. Himmelstein appeared in Inglourious Basterds but the scene was cut. She was an old woman portrayed by Cloris Leachman who signs Donny Donowitz (Eli Roth)'s baseball bat.

Other historical figures who appear as characters or are mentioned include

 Reception 
 Critical response 
Dwight Garner of The New York Times said, "[Tarantino is] not out to impress us with the intricacy of his sentences. [...] He's here to tell a story in take-it-or-leave-it Elmore Leonard fashion. [...] He gets it: Pop culture is what America has instead of mythology." Peter Bradshaw of The Guardian wrote: "Tarantino made a career alchemising movie trash into gold [...] Now he's done the same with ... the pulpiest of pulp fiction. [...] The book is entirely outrageous and addictively readable on its own terms." Charles Arrowsmith of The Washington Post praised the novel's "authentically pulpy atmosphere" and Tarantino's "explosive dialogue" as being "almost as effective written down as read aloud."

Katie Rosseinsky of the Evening Standard wrote, "It's hard to escape the feeling that Tarantino is writing his own fanfiction - albeit with undeniable flair." Kayleigh Donaldson of Pajiba said, "Tarantino's skills are not best suited to the form of the novel... It's almost fascinating how [the novel] makes the film less interesting."

 Sales 
Upon publication, it became the number one selling book on Amazon. The novel debuted at number one on The New York Times fiction best-seller list in its first week.

 Accolades 
On September 1, 2021, Quentin Tarantino won the 2021 Writer Of The Year GQ Men Of The Year award for Once Upon a Time in Hollywood''.

Music 

The novel contained printed lyrics of five credited songs not heard in the film with the permission of Hal Leonard LLC.

Second novel

In June 2021, Tarantino revealed he wrote a complementary novel about the films of Rick Dalton, which he plans to publish.

References

2021 American novels
2021 debut novels
American alternate history novels
Fiction set in 1969
HarperCollins books
Hollywood novels
Novels about actors
Novels based on films
Novels set in Los Angeles
Works by Quentin Tarantino